Glasgow station may refer to:

Glasgow station (Montana), an Amtrak station in Glasgow, Montana, USA
Glasgow Station, Ontario, former name of McNab/Braeside, Ontario, Canada
Glasgow Central station, a railway station in Glasgow, Scotland
Glasgow Queen Street railway station, the other railway terminus in the Scottish city

See also
Glasgow (disambiguation)